Zhana-Aul (Ĵañı-Aul; , Jaña auyl) is a rural locality (a selo) and the administrative centre of Kazakhskoye Rural Settlement of Kosh-Agachsky District, the Altai Republic, Russia. The population was 796 as of 2016. There are 16 streets.

Geography 
Zhana-Aul is located 27 km southeast of Kosh-Agach (the district's administrative centre) by road. Kokorya is the nearest rural locality.

References 

Rural localities in Kosh-Agachsky District